Ayatollah Montazeri is another term for Hussein-Ali Montazeri, an Iranian cleric.

Ayatollah Montazeri may also refer to:
 Ayatollah Montazeri-ye Bala, village in Khuzestan Province, Iran
 Ayatollah Montazeri-ye Pain, village in Khuzestan Province, Iran